Busted is a 1997 comedy film, starring Corey Feldman, Corey Haim and Elliott Gould. The film marked Corey Feldman's directorial debut. Due to his frequent absences and drug use during filming, Corey Haim was eventually fired by director Corey Feldman. Feldman later said it was one of the hardest and most painful things he ever did.

Plot
The police force of the somewhat-quiet town of Amity decide to get crime off the streets and decide that the prostitutes are better off working out of the police station. The ladies take over several police duties to ensure their cover.

Cast
 Corey Feldman as David
 Corey Haim as Clifford
 Dominick Brascia as Evan Howe
 Elliott Gould as Game Show Host
 Mariana Morgan as Captain Mary Mae
 Julie Strain as Annette
 Michael Maguire as Captain Alexander Smith
 Ava Fabian as Lacey
 Devin DeVasquez as Casey
 Monique Parent as Carrie
 Rhonda Rydell as Elizabeth

References

 Busted IMDb. Retrieved December 26, 2005.

External links
 

1996 films
1990s teen comedy films
1996 directorial debut films
1996 comedy films
1997 comedy films
1997 films
1990s English-language films